Frank Rist (30 March 1914 – 8 September 2001) was an English cricketer. He played for Essex between 1934 and 1953. He also played football as a centre half in the Football League for Charlton Athletic.

References

External links

1914 births
2001 deaths
English cricketers
Essex cricketers
Footballers from Wandsworth
Cricketers from Greater London
English footballers
Association football wing halves
Leyton Orient F.C. players
Charlton Athletic F.C. players
Grays Thurrock United F.C. players
Blackpool F.C. wartime guest players
Liverpool F.C. wartime guest players
Bradford City A.F.C. wartime guest players
Notts County F.C. wartime guest players
Southport F.C. wartime guest players
Southern Football League players
English Football League players
Colchester United F.C. players
Tonbridge Angels F.C. players
West Ham United F.C. non-playing staff
Clapton Orient F.C. wartime guest players
Royal Air Force personnel of World War II